The Grand Prix Gazipasa is a cycling race held in Turkey and is rated as a 1.2 event.

Winners

References

Cycle races in Turkey
2019 establishments in Turkey
Recurring sporting events established in 2019